Part of a series of articles upon Archaeology of Kosovo

The Roman site of Çifllak in Kosovo is situated on the left side of the Drin river, not far from the shore.  

Archaeological researches carried out at the Çifllak area during the first decade of the first millennium, resulted with the discovery of the remains of a Roman bath complex, with wide dimensions, and where a pool has been unearthed and documented. Archaeological material discovered at this site show local earthenware production and imported terra sigillata. Besides metal tools, coins, glass jars and architectonic structures, various artifacts for everyday use have been unearthed at this site.

When looked from the chronological aspect, the Roman bath is dated between the 2nd and 4th century AD. Nonetheless, archaeologists who have excavated this site, have determined two phases of construction and reconstruction.

See also 
Archaeology of Kosovo
List of settlements in Illyria

References 

Cifllak
Archaeology of Illyria
Illyrian Kosovo
Dardanians
Dardania (Roman province)
Moesia
Roman towns and cities in Kosovo